Javier Mendoza (born March 5, 1991) is a Mexican professional boxer and a former IBF Light flyweight champion.

Professional career
On September 20, 2014, Mendoza captured the vacant IBF Light Flyweight title by defeating former champion Ramón García Hirales via unanimous decision.

Professional boxing record

{|class="wikitable" style="text-align:center; font-size:95%"
|-
!Result
!Record
!Opponent
!Type
!Round, time
!Date
!Location
!Notes
|-
|Win
|25–4–1
|align=left| Manuel Jimenez
|
|
|
|align=left|
|align=left|
|-
|Loss
|24–4–1
|align=left| Ulises Lara
|
|
|
|align=left|
|align=left|
|-
|Loss
|24–3–1
|align=left| Akira Yaegashi
|
|
|
|align=left|
|align=left|
|-
|Win
|24–2–1
|align=left| Milan Melindo
|
|
|
|align=left|
|align=left|
|-
|Win
|23–2–1
|align=left| Mauricio Fuentes
|
|
|
|align=left|
|align=left|
|-
|Win
|22–2–1
|align=left| Ramón García Hirales
|
|
|
|align=left|
|align=left|
|-
|Win
|21–2–1
|align=left| Ricardo Armenta
|
|
|
|align=left|
|align=left|
|-
|Win
|20–2–1
|align=left| Javier Meraz
|
|
|
|align=left|
|align=left|
|-
|Win
|19–2–1
|align=left| Cristian Aguilar
|
|
|
|align=left|
|align=left|
|-
|Win
|18–2–1
|align=left| Arcadio Salazar
|
|
|
|align=left|
|align=left|
|-
|Win
|17–2–1
|align=left| Francisco Aguilar
|
|
|
|align=left|
|align=left|
|-
|Win
|16–2–1
|align=left| Armando Vazquez
|
|
|
|align=left|
|align=left|
|-
|Win
|15–2–1
|align=left| Arcadio Salazar
|
|
|
|align=left|
|align=left|
|-
|Win
|14–2–1
|align=left| German Aaron Cota
|
|
|
|align=left|
|align=left|
|-
|Loss
|13–2–1
|align=left| Jorge Guerrero
|
|
|
|align=left|
|align=left|
|-
|Win
|13–1–1
|align=left| Osvaldo Ibarra
|
|
|
|align=left|
|align=left|
|-
|Win
|12–1–1
|align=left| Rigoberto Casillas
|
|
|
|align=left|
|align=left|
|-
|Win
|11–1–1
|align=left| Ricardo Armenta
|
|
|
|align=left|
|align=left|
|-
|Win
|10–1–1
|align=left| Francisco Aguilar
|
|
|
|align=left|
|align=left|
|-
|Win
|9–1–1
|align=left| Rogelio Armenta
|
|
|
|align=left|
|align=left|
|-
|Win
|8–1–1
|align=left| Manuel Galaviz
|
|
|
|align=left|
|align=left|
|-
|Win
|7–1–1
|align=left| Juan Manuel Armendariz
|
|
|
|align=left|
|align=left|
|-
|Win
|6–1–1
|align=left| Arcadio Salcido
|
|
|
|align=left|
|align=left|
|-
|Win
|5–1–1
|align=left| Juan Manuel Armendariz
|
|
|
|align=left|
|align=left|
|-
|Loss
|4–1–1
|align=left| Manuel Jiménez
|
|
|
|align=left|
|align=left|
|-
|Win
|4–0–1
|align=left| Gustavo Enriquez
|
|
|
|align=left|
|align=left|
|-
|Win
|3–0–1
|align=left| Felipe Salguero
|
|
|
|align=left|
|align=left|
|-
|Draw
|2–0–1
|align=left| Ernesto Armenta
|
|
|
|align=left|
|align=left|
|-
|Win
|2–0
|align=left| Jesus Juarez
|
|
|
|align=left|
|align=left|
|-
|Win
|1–0
|align=left| Ernesto Armenta
|
|
|
|align=left|
|align=left|

See also
List of light-flyweight boxing champions
List of Mexican boxing world champions

References

External links

Living people
1991 births
Mexican male boxers
Light-flyweight boxers
World light-flyweight boxing champions
International Boxing Federation champions
Southpaw boxers
Boxers from Baja California
Sportspeople from Tijuana